The 1997 Metro Atlantic Athletic Conference baseball tournament took place from May 9 through 11, 1997. The top two regular season finishers of the league's two divisions met in the double-elimination tournament held at Heritage Park in Colonie, New York.  won their third consecutive (and third overall) tournament championship and advanced to the play-in round for the right to play in the 1997 NCAA Division I baseball tournament.

Seeding 
The top two teams from each division were seeded based on their conference winning percentage. They then played a double-elimination tournament.

Results

All-Tournament Team 
The following players were named to the All-Tournament Team.

Most Valuable Player 
Mike Ostrander was named Tournament Most Valuable Player.

References 

Tournament
Metro Atlantic Athletic Conference Baseball Tournament
Metro Atlantic Athletic Conference baseball tournament